Butwal, officially Butwal Sub-Metropolitan City, is a sub-metropolitan city and economic hub in Lumbini Province in West Nepal. Butwal has a city population of 195,054 as per 2021 Nepal census.

The city is one of the tri-cities of rapidly growing Butwal-Tilottama-Bhairahawa urban agglomeration primarily based on the Siddhartha Highway in West Nepal with a total urban agglomerated population of 421,018. It is one of the fastest-growing cities in Nepal for health, education, construction, communication, trade, and banking sectors. It has highway connections to the Indian border at Sunauli and to the hilly towns in Tansen and Pokhara valley, and holds the title of being "The Best City in Nepal" five times in a row.

Geographically, Butwal is at the intersection of Nepal's two different National Highways, Mahendra Highway and Siddhartha Highway. It connects western Nepal with the capital Kathmandu through the highway and air links (via Gautam Buddha International Airport at Siddharthanagar). The city stands beside the bank of Tinau River, and at the northern edge of the Terai plain below the Siwalik Hills. Its name, Butwal was derived from Batauli Bazaar , the town's oldest residential area which is located on the western bank of the Tinau River.

Butwal was officially declared as a sub-metropolitan city on 2 December 2014 by combining two neighboring VDCs Motipur and Semlar. The city is currently headed by Nepali Congress leader Khel Raj Pandey.

History

Prehistory
Fossils of ancient hominoids Ramapithecus were found near the Tinau (Tilottama) River, also known as paari Butwal, as early as 1932, including a 10.1-million-year-old tooth.

Medieval history
In medieval time Butwal was known as Khasauli as it was believed to be established by Khas king . Later after collapse of Khasa empire it was ruled by Sen kings of Palpa when it developed as a trading point between hilly people and plain people. In 17th century palpa with Butwal was annexed by Gorkha Empire. Butwal was also a place where a major battle of Anglo-Nepalese war was fought i.e Battle of Jitgadi Fort where Gorkha army lead by Ujir Singh Thapa beat British forces.

Modern history

The area was a loose settlement which acted as a trading post between the hilly districts of Lumbini zone and the Indian plains. Thus, historically Butwal connected Nepali Pahari people with their Indian neighbors. As the British East India Company annexed Awadh from its hereditary rulers while the Shah Dynasty attempted to annex the Terai, Butwal became one of bones of contention leading to the Gurkha War 1814–16.

When King Tribhuvan fled to India in 1950 during the revolt against the Rana dynasty he traveled through Butwal. Then it was little more than a village on the western bank of Tilottama River (also known as Tinau).

Butwal is a relatively newly urbanized area, emerging and growing rapidly only since 1960. With the completion of Siddhartha Highway (H10) in 1968, starting from the border at Sunauli through Butwal to Pokhara and then in the 1990s Mahendra Highway(H01) across the full east–west expanse of Nepal's Terai. Butwal has made tremendous progress in the country.

Demographics

The population of Butwal is 91,733 (census 2015), according to present stage the population is rapidly increasing with around 150,000 above and consists of people of mixed groups and castes; these includes Pahari immigrants from nearby hill districts especially Palpa, Arghakhanchi, Parbat, Gulmi, Syangja and  also local people from Terai origin.l

The population distribution in different wards in 2011 was as follows:

Caste and Ethnic groups 

The largest single caste and ethnic groups in butwal is Hill Brahman, who makes 30% of the population, Magar with 19% comes to second place, Other ethnic groups in pokhara  includes the Chhetri (14%),Newar (8%), Tharu (7%), and others various ethnic groups makes(23%) of the population.

Languages 

At the time of the 2011 Census of Nepal, 73% of the population in the district spoke Nepali, 8% Magar, 5% Tharu,5% Newari, and 9% spoke other languages as their first language.

Economy
Butwal is mostly a commercial and trading city, an upcoming link city for the nearby tourist spots. The GDP of Butwal was about US$1 billion in 2018 making it one of the major cities in Nepal. The economy of Butwal centers around trade, services, and industries. The old trading spots are Traffic Chowk, BP Chowk, Amarpath, Raj Margh Chaurah, and Nepalgunj Road. Besides modern shopping, a traditional form of the market called Haat Bazar similar to greengrocer runs twice a week on Wednesdays and Saturdays. It has the second largest vegetable market in the country called Butwal Sabji Mandi in local terms. All kinds of traders, farmers, and entrepreneurs sell goods and vegetables directly to retail & wholesale customers in a busy market setup.

Service aspects of the economy are mainly centered on banking, education, transportation, and health sectors. Thus, increasing numbers of people are involved in these sectors for their jobs.

Butwal is also a connecting city between nearby tourist towns of Tansen, Kapilvastu, and Lumbini. It is the gateway to nearby cities of Sunwal, Pokhara, and Bharatpur. It is also a busy land route to enter Nepal from India for tourists and others. Thus, Butwal is witnessing huge investments in the hospitality sector as well. To boost up tourism and MICE opportunities, the government plans to set up an international conference center at Ramnagar in Butwal. All these developments hint towards a large economic potential for the development of the region.

The private commerce and trade in Butwal are united under the umbrella of the Butwal Chamber of Commerce & Industry (BuCCI). Audhyogig Byapar Mela-Butwal is an industrial exhibition held in Butwal. This exhibition is organized annually in the month of Poush (generally December–January) and is one of the largest of its kind in Nepal.

Health

Butwal is home to Lumbini Provincial Hospital, one of the oldest hospitals in this region, which is considered a crucial resource for healthcare to poor citizens who cannot afford private hospitals.

In 2020, the Tinau International Hospital was inaugurated in the heart of Butwal in Sukkhanagar. The hospital is known for its high quality care and services with a renowned orthopedics and trauma department. Patients from far-western regions and hilly regions to the north including Palpa, Gulmi, Arghakhanchi come to seek specialized care at different hospitals in the city.

Transport

This city dominates any other city in terms of the number of bus services in Nepal. Until 2003, most of the fleet was older large buses; since then operators have added newer minibuses popularly called micro. Older jeeps are used to take people to nearby hilly regions. Rickshaws are used for short-distance urban transport. Motorcycles are a common means of personal transportation around town. The number registered has increased from 1,200 in 1999 to 80,000 in 2008.

Nearly 100 buses depart everyday to Kathmandu from Butwal Bus Terminal. Besides the capital Kathmandu, the bus services are also frequently available to other major cities of Pokhara, Dharan, Kakarbhitta, Janakpur, Birgunj, Hetauda, Bharatpur, Tansen, Siddharthanagar, Dang, Nepalgunj, Dhangadi, and Mahendranagar.

Education
Butwal is set to be an educational hub in the Rupandehi district. The literacy rate in the city is considered to be high. It has held the record for Nepal Top students in SLC as well as the HSEB examination numerous time

 Butwal Bahumukhi Campus, Golpark
 Eden English Boarding School, Naharpur
 Kanti Higher Secondary School, Haatbazar Line
 New Horizon English Boarding Higher Secondary School, Kalikanagar

Places of interest
Devdaha - A municipality in Rupandehi District of Nepal, the ancient capital of Koliya Kingdom, located 7 km east of Lumbini and east of Butwal and shares a border with Nawalparasi district on the east side. It is identified as the maternal home of Queen Mayadevi, Prajapati Gautami and Princess Yasodhara. Shitalnagar Khairani, Bhawanipur, Bairimai, Kan yamai, Khayardanda are some sites for visitors.
 Gajedi Taal - A lake located about 21 km west of Butwal. Lausha village of Gajedi VDC. A few hillocks and landscapes make it more artistic and adventurous. It is well known as a spot for picnics, gatherings, and boating in the lake.
Aap Khola (Mango River) - people go swimming and bring water during droughts. The Manakamana Temple is nearby.
Butwal Hill Park (Deepnagar) - is one of the few notable areas in Butwal. People go there for hiking, morning walks, enjoying and having fun with friends & families. A wide view of Butwal City can be viewed from the top of this park.
Jitgadi - A fortress during Angol Nepal war, Narayan temple built by (1864 B.S.) Hanuman temple and Shivalaya of Hanumagngadhi, Jalabinayak M9ehadev temple, Narayan Temple, Siddababa temple, Nuwakot, etc. are centers of attraction in Butwal.
 Murgiya Jharbaira (Bolbom Dham) - is about 13 km west from Butwal city centre. The Temple of Lord Shiva (Parroha Parmeshower Bolbam Dham) is situated here and is a holy site for Hindu Followers.
 Manimukunda Sen Park (Phulbari) - The winter palace of Palpali Sen clan. There are ruins and antiquities of the palace of Manimukunda Sen, an ancient Palpali king, containing 6 large rooms as well as a royal residence, administrative, and grandeur of Butwal. Siddharthanagar and other neighboring villages of Rupandehi district can be seen from here at night. His Majesty's Government, the archaeological department has attempted to maintain it since 1991. Now, Butwal municipality has formed a council for the conservation of Manimukunda Sen Park to conduct the Phulbari Development Programme and attempt to make it a tourist resort.
Sainamaina - Located about 12 km. west from Butwal and to North from Banakatti, Sainamaina is an open museum. Among the different Gramas villages of Shakya King, it was in the samgrama site. An Indian queen (Begum Hazrat Mahal of Awadh) came to this area with her soldiers and porters (‘Sena’ and Mena’) because of the British disturbance in her kingdom and finally, this area came to be known as Saina Maina. It is a treasure trove of ancient ruins and antiquities: statues of dancing saints, ruins of palace, well etc.
Siddha Baba Temple - Lies on the outskirts of Butwal Sub-Metro, in Palpa District. The area near this temple is prone to landslides. The temple is overcrowed by devotees during the festival of Shiva Ratri, Nepali New Year (Bikram Sambat-B.S), and weekends. (See photo)
The Statue of Buddha (Jogidanda) - It was very significant ruins of having the values of classical art are scattered here and there. This archaeological site is occupied by homeless and landless people. Some of the antiquities of this site are seen around the Lumbini museum.
 Muktidham, Nayagaon - is a sacred temple site for devotees located in Nayagaon, approximately 10 km from the city center.
 Global Peace Park - This is a newly built site in Butwal near Tamnagar. A place for outings during the summer and peaceful surroundings.
 Banbatika Forest Resort - This is a kind of forest park opened for locals which lie in the Tilottama Municipality adjacent to Butwal Sub-Metropolitan. Usually known for picnic spots and a small zoo for visitors and Research Centre.
 Lumbini - The Birthplace of Gautama Buddha. The Mecca for Buddhist followers in Nepal & all over the world. Lumbini is situated 40 km south-west of Butwal and is known as the birthplace of Lord Gautam Buddha.
 Padma Chaitya Bihar a century old Buddhist monastery in the right bank of Tinau River.

Notable people
Cool Pokharel, Singer and musician
Surakshya Panta, Model and actress
Birendra Agrahari, Singer
Kushal Bhurtel, Cricket player

Events
 Tillotama Gold Cup is a national level football championship held annually in Butwal

See also
 Shrawan Danda, neighbourhood in Butwal city affected by landslide
 Kathmandu
 Pokhara
 Sunwal
 Biratnagar
 Dharan
 Birgunj
 Bhairahawa
 Bharatpur, Nepal

References

 
Populated places in Rupandehi District
Nepal municipalities established in 1959
Submetropolitan municipalities of Nepal